The Boy Who Talked to Badgers is a 1975 American made-for-television adventure film directed by Gary Nelson, starring Christian Juttner and Carl Betz. It was produced by Walt Disney Productions and based on the novel Incident at Hawk's Hill by Allan W. Eckert. The film was originally broadcast on NBC as a two-part episode on The Wonderful World of Disney on September 14 and 21, 1975.

Plot
Benjy (Juttner) is a six-year-old Canadian boy who prefers the company of animals over humans and tries to spend as much time as possible with his animal friends. His parents realize this could eventually become a problem, but they don't have the heart to take away Benjy's only pleasure.

The boy befriends a badger. On one of Benjy's nature walks, he tries catching trout in a stream. He wanders too far out and gets trapped in a raging river and is carried far from his home.  After over a week-long search, brother John finds Benjy.  He had been living in a cave shared with a badger.  Old Badger shared his fish catches with the boy.

After a happy family reunion, trapper Burton returns to the ranch and shoots the badger.  The animal dies, but Ben returns to Old Badger's grave years later as an adult.

Cast
Carl Betz as Will MacDonald
Salome Jens as Esther MacDonald
Christian Juttner as Benjy MacDonald
Robert Donner as Trapper Burton
Denver Pyle as Narrator (Ben MacDonald as an adult)
Stuart Lee as John MacDonald
Georgie Collins as Mrs. Martha Gilman

Production
The Boy Who Talked to Badgers was filmed on location in Alberta, Canada.

References

External links

1975 television films
1975 films
1970s adventure films
American adventure films
Films directed by Gary Nelson
Films produced by James Algar
Films about badgers
Walt Disney anthology television series episodes
Disney television films
Films shot in Alberta
1970s American films